François Fourquet (1940 – 17 February 2016) was a French economist, professor of economics at University of Paris VIII.

Fourquet studied at the Institut d'Études Politiques de Paris After an internship at La Borde clinic in 1965, he worked there as administrative secretary under Félix Guattari from 1966 to 1972. In 1972 he joined the Center for Institutional Study, Research, and Training (CERFI), and his first book The Historical Ideal appeared as issue 14 of the CERFI magazine, Recherches.

Works
 L'ideal historique, 1974. Special issue (no. 14) of Recherches.
 (with Lion Murard) Les équipements du pouvoir: villes, territoires et équipements collectifs,UGE,  1976.
 Les Comptes de la puissance: histoire de la comptabilité nationale et du Plan, in Recherches, 1980.
 (with Lion Murard) Histoire de la psychiatrie de secteur In Recherches, 1980
 Richesse et puissance: une généalogie de la valeur, XVIe-XVIIIe siècle, 1989
 La naissance des villes nouvelles: anatomie d'une décision, 1961-1969, 2004

External links
 Personal site of François Fourquet

References

1940 births
2016 deaths
French economists